Sylvio Kroll (born 29 April 1965 in Lübben) is a German former gymnast who competed in the 1988 Summer Olympics and in the 1992 Summer Olympics. In October 1986, he was awarded a Star of People's Friendship in gold (second class) for his sporting success.

References

1965 births
Living people
German male artistic gymnasts
Olympic gymnasts of East Germany
Olympic gymnasts of Germany
Gymnasts at the 1988 Summer Olympics
Gymnasts at the 1992 Summer Olympics
Olympic silver medalists for East Germany
Olympic medalists in gymnastics
Medalists at the 1988 Summer Olympics
Medalists at the World Artistic Gymnastics Championships
People from Lübben (Spreewald)
Sportspeople from Brandenburg